Zehava Shmueli (born May 19, 1955) is a retired long-distance runner from Israel. She competed for her native country at the 1984 Summer Olympics in Los Angeles, California. There she ended up in 30th place out of 50 competitors in the women's marathon. Shmueli set her personal best in the classic distance (2:40.29) in 1983.

Achievements

References
 sports-reference

1955 births
Living people
Israeli female long-distance runners
Olympic athletes of Israel
Athletes (track and field) at the 1984 Summer Olympics
Israeli female marathon runners
World Athletics Championships athletes for Israel
Israeli people of Iraqi-Jewish descent